Guthrie is a city and county seat in Logan County, Oklahoma, United States, and a part of the Oklahoma City Metroplex. The population was 10,191 at the 2010 census, a 2.7 percent increase from the figure of 9,925 in the 2000 census.

First known as a railroad station stop, after the Land Run of 1889, Guthrie immediately gained 10,000 new residents, who began to develop the town. It was rapidly improved and was designated as the territorial capital, and in 1907 as the first state capital of Oklahoma. In 1910, state voters chose the larger Oklahoma City as the new capital in a special election.

Guthrie is nationally significant for its collection of late 19th and early 20th century commercial architecture. The Guthrie Historic District includes more than 2,000 buildings and is designated as a National Historic Landmark. Historic tourism is important to the city, and its Victorian architecture provides a backdrop for Wild West and territorial-style entertainment, carriage tours, replica trolley cars, specialty shops, and art galleries.

History 

Guthrie was established in 1887 as a railroad station called Deer Creek on the Southern Kansas Railway (later acquired by the Atchison, Topeka and Santa Fe Railway) running from the Kansas–Oklahoma border to Purcell. The name was later changed to Guthrie, named for jurist John Guthrie of Topeka, Kansas. A post office was established on April 4, 1889.

In 1889 some fifty thousand potential settlers gathered at the edges of the Unassigned Lands in hopes of staking a claim to a plot. At noon on April 22, 1889, cannons resounded at a  section of Indian Territory, launching president Benjamin Harrison's "Hoss Race" or Land Run of 1889. People ran for both farmlands and towns.

During the next six hours, about 10,000 people settled in what became the capital of the new Territory of Oklahoma. Within months, Guthrie was developed as a modern brick and stone "Queen of the Prairie" with municipal water, electricity, a mass transit system, and underground parking garages for horses and carriages.

Guthrie's western heritage includes the fact that, on April 13, 1898, outlaw Richard "Little Dick" West, a former member of the Wild Bunch gang, was in town when approached by legendary lawmen Heck Thomas and Bill Tilghman.  He refused to surrender and was killed in the resulting gunfight.  He is buried in the Summit View Cemetery in Guthrie near outlaw Bill Doolin.

Hobart Johnstone Whitley, also known as HJ and the 'Father of Hollywood,' was the first president of the Guthrie Chamber of Commerce. Whitley built the first brick block building in the territory for his National Loan & Trust Company.  He was asked by the local people to be the first Governor of Oklahoma.  Whitley traveled to Washington, D.C. where he persuaded the U.S. Congress to allow Guthrie to be the new capital of the future state of Oklahoma.  This was specified in the 1906 Oklahoma Enabling Act, which established certain requirements for the new state constitution. By 1907, when Guthrie became the state capital, it looked like a well-established Eastern city.

Guthrie prospered as the administrative center of the territory, but it was eclipsed in economic influence by Oklahoma City early in the 20th century. Oklahoma City had become a major junction for several railroads and had also attracted a major industry in the form of meat packing. Oklahoma City business leaders began campaigning soon after statehood to make Oklahoma City the new state capital, and in 1910 a special election was held to determine the location of the state capital.  96,488 votes were cast for Oklahoma City; 31,031 for Guthrie; and 8,382 for Shawnee. Governor Charles N. Haskell, who was in Tulsa on the day of the election, ordered his secretary W. B. Anthony to have Oklahoma Secretary of State Bill Cross obtain the state seal and transport it to Oklahoma City, despite having been served a restraining order by Logan County Sheriff John Mahoney blocking the transfer. Anthony obtained written authorization from Cross, retrieved the seal from the Logan County courthouse, and delivered it to Oklahoma City.

After the capital was transferred, Guthrie lost much of its government-related business and numerous residents. It began to dwindle in size and soon lost its status as Oklahoma's second-largest city, initially to Muskogee, then later to Tulsa. A challenge to the new state capital was heard in the Oklahoma Supreme Court; it upheld the election and move in its ruling on February 9, 1911, as did the United States Supreme Court in 1911.

The center district of Guthrie was designated a National Historic Landmark by the National Park Service in 1999, in recognition of the city's importance to state history, as well as its rich architecture.

Today 
As a result of Guthrie's early loss of prominence, it has a well-preserved Victorian enclave.  Whereas growth and inattentive urban planning caused other Oklahoma towns such as Oklahoma City to destroy much of their early downtown architecture, much of the entire central business and residential district of Guthrie is intact.

The National Finals Steer Roping Rodeo is held in Guthrie. On six occasions, the Texas rodeo promoter Dan Taylor was chute director for the competition in Guthrie.

Historical tourism has become a significant industry for the town.  Guthrie is the largest urban Historic district in Oklahoma, containing 2,169 buildings,  and 400 city blocks.  Guthrie is a "Certified City;" it has received a Community Development Block Grant to inventory infrastructure features for Capital Improvement Planning.

Guthrie has two lakes to the south, Liberty Lake and Guthrie Lake. Its museums include the Oklahoma Territorial Museum and hosts the Oklahoma International Bluegrass Festival, which draws 15,000 visitors annually. In addition, Guthrie claims to be the "Bed and Breakfast capital of Oklahoma.

Guthrie also hosts the Guthrie Scottish Rite Masonic Temple, one of the world's largest Masonic Centers, which in years past has brought artists such as Henry Mancini, Lena Horne, Victor Borge, and Luciano Pavarotti to local audiences.

Guthrie has Oklahoma's oldest year-round professional theatre company, the Pollard Theatre Company. With an emphasis on creative story-telling to illuminate the shared human experience, the Pollard produces six or more plays and musicals annually, enlisting artists across the United States.  The annual holiday favorite is A Territorial Christmas Carol.

Guthrie is served by the Guthrie News-Leader newspaper.

Geography
Guthrie lies along one of the primary corridors into Texas and Mexico, and is a four-hour drive from the Dallas-Fort Worth metropolitan area. The city is located in the Frontier Country region in the center of the state.

The total area is 2.81 percent water.

Climate
Guthrie has a humid subtropical climate, with frequent variations in weather daily and seasonally, except during the consistently hot and humid summer months. Consistent winds, usually from the south or south-southeast during the summer, help temper the hotter weather.  Consistent northerly winds during the winter can intensify cold periods.

Demographics

As of the census of 2000, there were 9,925 people, 3,854 households, and 2,474 families residing in the city.  The population density was 531.6 people per square mile (205.3/km). There were 4,308 housing units at an average density of 230.7 per square mile (89.1/km).  The racial makeup of the city was 75.84% White, 15.77% African American, 2.97% Native American, 0.42% Asian, 0.02% Pacific Islander, 1.94% from other races, and 3.03% from two or more races. Hispanic or Latino of any race were 3.79% of the population.

There were 3,854 households, out of which 29.2% had children under the age of 18 living with them, 46.7% were married couples living together, 14.2% had a female householder with no husband present, and 35.8% were non-families. 32.1% of all households were made up of individuals, and 15.1% had someone living alone who was 65 years of age or older. The average household size was 2.37 and the average family size was 2.99.

In the city, the population was spread out, with 24.7% under the age of 18, 11.5% from 18 to 24, 24.7% from 25 to 44, 21.4% from 45 to 64, and 17.7% who were 65 years of age or older. The median age was 37 years. For every 100 females, there were 86.3 males. For every 100 females age 18 and over, there were 79.9 males.

The median income for a household in the city was $30,460, and the median income for a family was $38,732. Males had a median income of $27,948 versus $21,186 for females. The per capita income for the city was $15,774. About 9.8% of families and 17.3% of the population were below the poverty line, including 18.1% of those under age 18 and 18.4% of those age 65 or over.

In Media

Film
Several films have been shot in whole or in part within the city:
 Parts of Fast Charlie... the Moonbeam Rider (1979) was filmed in Guthrie.
 Guthrie's main street can be seen briefly in the movie Rain Man (1988) starring Dustin Hoffman and Tom Cruise.
 The Warner Bros. 1996 movie Twister (1996) starring Bill Paxton and Helen Hunt used this town for the drive-in scene. In the original screenplay for this movie, it was going to be destroyed instead of Wakita.
 The movie Public Enemies (1996) with Theresa Russell was filmed in the town.
 My Heroes Have Always Been Cowboys (1991) was filmed in Guthrie. Ben Johnson played Jesse Dalton.
 Fingerprints  (2006)
 The Killer Inside Me (2010) was filmed in Guthrie starring Jessica Alba, Kate Hudson, and Casey Affleck.
 Rudderless (2014) - Directed by William H. Macy, starring Billy Crudup and Anton Yelchin.
 The Girl Who Believes in Miracles (2021)Guthrie is mentioned in the 2021 movie Stillwater starring Matt Damon.

Literature
 The protagonist of the Adam Binder series of fantasy novels is originally from Guthrie, as is series author David R. Slayton.

Notable people
 Byron Berline, bluegrass musician
 John Hazelton Cotteral, United States district and appellate judge
 Bill Doolin, outlaw who founded the Wild Bunch; interred at Summit View Cemetery in Guthrie
 Dennis Thomas Flynn, postmaster and delegate to the territorial convention
 Jerry Hopper, film and television director; born in Guthrie
 Helen Holmes, journalist, historian, Women's Army Corps officer, mayor of Guthrie
 Joshua Key, United States Army soldier who deserted to Canada due to his opposition to the Iraq War
 France Laux, baseball broadcaster for St. Louis Cardinals; born in Guthrie
 Carrie Nation, Prohibition advocate and publisher of The Hatchet 
 Ted Power, former professional baseball player; born in Guthrie
 Peter Ramondetta, professional skateboarder; raised in Guthrie
 Horace Speed, first District Attorney for Oklahoma Territory; continued to live and practice law in Guthrie until 1913
 Gene Stephenson, former Wichita State University baseball coach 
 Phil Stephenson, former MLB player for the Oakland Athletics, Chicago Cubs, and San Diego Padres
 W.K. Stratton, author and journalist; born and educated in Guthrie
 Stanley Vestal, author of the American Old West, partly reared in Guthrie
 Hobart Johnstone Whitley, land developer, banker, Rock Island Railroad executive

References

External links

 City of Guthrie official website
 Guthrie Chamber of Commerce
 History of Guthrie
 Encyclopedia of Oklahoma History and Culture - Guthrie

 
Oklahoma City metropolitan area
Cities in Oklahoma
Oklahoma
Cities in Logan County, Oklahoma
County seats in Oklahoma
Populated places established in 1889
1889 establishments in Indian Territory